The Toronto Lions were a junior ice hockey team in the Ontario Hockey Association from 1931 to 1939. They played at Maple Leaf Gardens in Toronto and were coached by Eddie Livingstone. The team was previously known as the Victorias, and changed their name in 1931 when they became affiliated with the Lions Club.

Lions centre Jimmy Good won the OHA scoring title in 1934-35, playing with future Hockey Hall of Fame inductee Gordie Drillon on his wing. Three alumni of the Toronto Lions graduated to play in the National Hockey League: Drillon, Charlie Phillips, and Lefty Wilson.

Yearly results
Results prior to 1937–38 unavailable.

References

1931 establishments in Ontario
1939 disestablishments in Ontario
Defunct Ontario Hockey League teams
Lio
Ice hockey clubs established in 1931
Lions Clubs International
Sports clubs disestablished in 1939